Hotchand Molchand Gurbakhshani (or Gurbuxani) (Sindhi: هوتچند مولچند گربخشاڻي) (March 8, 1884 - February 11, 1947) was an educationist and scholar who is well known for his annotated translation of the Sufi poetic compendium Shah Jo Risalo. He served as Principal of D.J. Sindh College Karachi. He also served as the first president of Sindh Historical Society.

Biography 
Hotchand Gurbakhshani was born in a well educated Hindu Amil family of Hyderabad, Sindh, British India (Now Pakistan) on 8 March 1884. His father Deewan Molchand was employee of Revenue Department. His grandfather Deewan Nainsukhdas was a landlord. After attending Primary School, he was admitted in the  Nevelrai Hiranand Academy of Hyderabad from where he passed matriculation examination in 1899. Then he went to Karachi and received Bachelor of Arts degree from D.J. Sindh College. It was one of the best colleges of Sindh at that time. He received Master of Arts degree in English and Persian from Wilson College Bombay (now Mumbai) in 1907. He was one of the best students of this college and based on merit he was offered position of Assistant Professor in the same college. He worked on this position only for a few months and then returned to Sindh  and joined his alma mater D.J. Sindh College Karachi as a Professor of Persian. In 1928, he went to UK and received PhD degree from University of London. The title of his PhD thesis was Mysticism in the Early 19th Century Poetry of England. He spent rest of his life in D.J. College and served as Dean Faculty of Arts, Vice Principal and then Principal of this college.  On 14 November 1921, on the request of Bombay University, he presented a scholarly report on Sindhi Literature to the University. Based on this report, the Bambay University decided to include Sindhi in college curriculum. Thus he laid the foundation for recognition of Sindhi language and literature in India. Dr Gurbakhshani was also founding President of Sindh Historical Society. The Journal of this society published valuable research articles on history of Sindh. This Society was founded for restructuring the history of Sindh.

His father and grandfather were devotees of Shah Inayat Sufi, the  Sufi saint of Sindh, so he himself was attracted towards Sufism since childhood. His students included Umar Bin Muhammad Daudpota,  Miran Mohammad Shah and Muhammad Ayub Khuhro.

Literary Contributions 
He compiled the poetry of Shah Jo Risalo, the poetry collection of Sufi poet Shah Abdul Latif Bhittai. He planned to publish this Risalo in four volumes. However, only three volumes could be published. The fourth volume is missing. Some sources say that he gave his unpublished fourth volume to one of his students for proofreading who misplaced/lost it and could not return it to the author. Other sources are of the opinion that the author could not publish it due to financial problems.

The first volume published in 1923 contained five surs (melodies), 500 baits, 32 wais, along with the meaning and etymology of words and terms. He also explained various verses and discussed the background and the folktales used in the surs. This volume included the Introduction called Muqadema consisting of the Shah's biography, his personality and religion. This introduction was later slightly revised and published as separate booklet Muqdama-i-Lateefi, in 1936, translated into English by Dr Habibullah Siddiqui and published by the Institute of Sindhology in 2009.

The second volume was published in 1924 which contained six surs (938 baits, 78 wais). The third volume published in 1931 contained 601 baits and 32 wais.

His other publications included the following:

 Shah Namah Abul Qasim Hassan Firdousi (Translation from Persian), Union Steam Press Karachi,  1918.
Rooh Rihan, 1933
Noor Jahan (Novel)
Lunwaria Ja Lal (The Saints of Lunwari)

Book on Hotchand Molchand Gurbakhshani 
Jettley M., Jotwani M.L. (Editors), Dr Hotchand Molchand Gurbakhshani: Sadin Jeewan Churpur and Rachnaoon ڊاڪٽر هوتچند مولچند گربخشاڻي: سندن جيون چرپر ۽ رچنائون), New Delhi, India, 1983.

Death 
Dr Gurbakhshani died on 11 February 1947 at the age of 64. He had one son Mohan who was married with Sati, the daughter of renowned scholar Bherumal Meharchand Advani.

References 

1884 births
1947 deaths
Sindhi-language writers
Writers from Sindh
Scholars from Sindh
People from Hyderabad, Sindh
Sindhi people